The Judge John A. Bingham House is located in Monroe, Wisconsin.

History
John A. Bingham held a number prominent local positions, including District Attorney of Green County, Wisconsin. The house was listed on the National Register of Historic Places in 1976 and on the State Register of Historic Places in 1989.

References

Houses on the National Register of Historic Places in Wisconsin
National Register of Historic Places in Green County, Wisconsin
Houses in Green County, Wisconsin
Greek Revival architecture in Wisconsin
Brick buildings and structures
Houses completed in 1850